Monster in My Family is a TV series produced by the Lifetime Movie Network that focuses on relatives of serial killers and their victims. The series has had two seasons.

Production and release
The show's executive producers are Jennifer Wagman, Laura Fleury, Paninee Theeranuntawat, and Gary Tarpinian. Season 1 premiered on July 1, 2015 and had six episodes. Season 2 debuted in 2017 and ran for four episodes.

Episodes

Season 1

Season 2

References

External links 
 Monster in My Family on IMDb

Lifetime (TV network) original programming
Non-fiction works about serial killers
Television series about serial killers
Documentary television series about crime in the United States